George M. Bryan Airport  is a public use airport in Oktibbeha County, Mississippi, United States. It is owned by the City of Starkville and located three nautical miles (6 km) southwest of its central business district. This airport is included in the National Plan of Integrated Airport Systems for 2011–2015, which categorized it as a general aviation facility.

Also known as Starkville / Oktibbeha County Airport or George M. Bryan Field, the airport was named in honor of World War II veteran and Starkville native George Martin Bryan.

Although many U.S. airports use the same three-letter location identifier for the FAA and IATA, this airport is assigned STF by the FAA but has no designation from the IATA (which assigned STF to Stephens Island in Queensland, Australia).

History 
Opened in 1934 as Starkville Municipal Airport. During World War II the airport was taken over abruptly by the government to be used as a glider training base (Starkville AF Auxiliary Field). Plans for the AAF Basic Training Detachment were for 150 students using the TG-5 gliders. The gliders were towed by the BT-13 Vultee "Vibrator". Students lived in the dormitories at Mississippi State College, where they also used its classrooms and dining facilities.

Facilities and aircraft 
George M. Bryan Airport covers an area of 635 acres (257 ha) at an elevation of 333 feet (101 m) above mean sea level. It has one runway designated 18/36 with an asphalt and concrete surface measuring 5,550 by 150 feet (1,692 x 46 m).

For the 12-month period ending January 19, 2012, the airport had 22,520 aircraft operations, an average of 61 per day: 98% general aviation and 2% military. At that time there were 40 aircraft based at this airport: 72.5% single-engine, 17.5% glider, 5% jet, 2.5% multi-engine, and 2.5% helicopter.

See also

 Mississippi World War II Army Airfields
 List of airports in Mississippi

References

External links 
 George M. Bryan Airport at Oktibbeha County website
 Starkville / Oktibbeha County Airport at City of Starkville website
 Aerial image as of March 1996 from USGS The National Map
 

Airports in Mississippi
Transportation in Oktibbeha County, Mississippi
Buildings and structures in Oktibbeha County, Mississippi
Airfields of the United States Army Air Forces in Mississippi
1934 establishments in Mississippi